Liboc is a district of the city of Prague, the capital of the Czech Republic. It is part of Prague 6, located near Divoká Šárka.

The Prague British International School Vlastina Campus is in Liboc; it formerly belonged to the pre-merger Prague British School.

References

Prague 6